Thomasville may refer to:

Thomasville, Alabama
Thomasville, Georgia
Thomasville, Iowa
Thomasville, Missouri
Thomasville, North Carolina
Thomasville, Pennsylvania

Other uses
Thomasville Furniture Industries, a company named after Thomasville, North Carolina

See also